The 1992 Phoenix Cardinals season was the 73rd season the team was in the National Football League (NFL). The team matched their previous output of 4–12. The Cardinals failed to qualify to the playoffs for the tenth straight season.

Two of the Cardinals’ victories came at the expense of playoff-bound teams. Phoenix defeated the defending Super Bowl champion Redskins in week five, and in week nine, the Cards toppled the 49ers, who finished the regular season with the NFL’s best record of 14–2.

Offseason

NFL Draft

Personnel

Staff

Roster

Regular season

Schedule

Standings

References

External links
 1992 Phoenix Cardinals at Pro-Football-Reference.com

1992
Phoenix Cardinals
Phoenix